NFC Employees Cooperative Housing Society or NFCHS is a housing estate located within union council 144 (Haloke), Constituency NA-134 , in the administrative town of Nishtar of Lahore, Punjab, Pakistan.

History 
The housing estate was founded by the employees of the National Fertilizer Corporation of Pakistan. NFCHS is divided into NFCHS I and NFCHS II. NFCHS I is a beautifully planned town managed and controlled by the executive committee of society elected after every 3 years by the residents of society via elections. The estate is divided into 4 portions called "Blocks" (Block A, Block B, Block C and Block D). Plot cutting is in 4 Kanals, 2 Kanals, 1 Kanal and 10 Marlas with separate roads, avenues And streets respectively. Society has 2 Jamia Mosques, market area, civic centre, a monumental central park with 10 mini parks, wide roads, public and private transport facility, proper water and sanitation system, State of the art street lights, 24/7 fool proof security and direct approach to M-2 motorway.

Location 
It is surrounded by WAPDA Town , Valancia and Tariq Gardens.
The objectives of society include the promotion of economic interests of its members and providing them with the highest level of quality life.

External links
 NFC Lahore Official Site

Nishtar Town
Company towns in Pakistan